Sleeth may refer to:

Sleeth, Indiana
Sleeth (surname), people with the surname

See also
Sleeth Site, an archaeological site in Illinois